Lampaul-Plouarzel is a commune in the Finistère department in Brittany in northwestern France.

Population
Inhabitants of Lampaul-Plouarzel are called in French Lampaulais.

See also
Communes of the Finistère department

References

External links

Official website 
Mayors of Finistère Association 

Communes of Finistère